The following lists events that happened during 1971 in Zaire.

Incumbents 
 President: Mobutu Sese Seko

Events

See also

 Zaire
 History of the Democratic Republic of the Congo
 1971 in the Democratic Republic of the Congo

References

Sources

 

 
1970s in Zaire
Years of the 20th century in Zaire
Zaire
Zaire